Baron Ironside, of Archangel and of Ironside in the County of Aberdeen, is a title in the Peerage of the United Kingdom. It was created in 1941 for Field Marshal Sir Edmund Ironside, previously Governor of Gibraltar and Chief of the Imperial General Staff.  the title is held by his grandson, the third Baron, who succeeded in that year. The second baron was Deputy Chairman of the House of Lords from 1974 to 1977. However, he lost his seat in parliament after the passing of the House of Lords Act 1999.

The family seat is The Priory House, near Boxted, Essex.

Barons Ironside (1941)
(William) Edmund Ironside, 1st Baron Ironside (1880–1959)
Edmund Oslac Ironside, 2nd Baron Ironside (1924–2020)
Charles Edmund Grenville Ironside, 3rd Baron Ironside (b. 1956)

The heir apparent is the present holder's son, the Hon. Frederick Thomas Grenville Ironside (b. 1991).

Arms

Notes

References

 Kidd, Charles, Williamson, David (editors). Debrett's Peerage and Baronetage (1990 edition). New York: St Martin's Press, 1990, 
 

Baronies in the Peerage of the United Kingdom
Noble titles created in 1941